Chalcot Square is a garden square in the Primrose Hill district of London, England.

The square was laid out between 1849 and 1860 and was known as St George's Square until 1937. It is a residential square, well known for its brightly coloured Italianate terraced houses. Every house on the square is grade-II listed.

Sylvia Plath and Ted Hughes lived at 3 Chalcot Square for years and Plath is commemorated with a blue plaque. They rented their home to Assia Wevill and David Wevill. Other famous residents have included Ralph, Marion, Ed, and David Miliband; Robert Plant; Joan Bakewell; India Knight and Eric Joyce; Alan Bennett, and M. R. D. Foot.

References

External links

Garden squares in London
Parks and open spaces in the London Borough of Camden
Squares in the London Borough of Camden
Primrose Hill